Kretzschmaria deusta, commonly known as brittle cinder, is a fungus and plant pathogen found in temperate regions of the Northern Hemisphere. It is common on a wide range of broadleaved trees including beech (Fagus), oak (Quercus), lime (Tilia), Horse Chestnut and maple (Acer). It also causes serious damage in the base of rubber, tea, coffee and palms. It causes a soft rot, initially and preferentially degrading cellulose and ultimately breaking down both cellulose and lignin, and colonises the lower stem and/or roots of living trees through injuries or by root contact with infected trees.  It can result in sudden breakage in otherwise apparently healthy trees. The fungus continues to decay wood after the host tree has died, making K. deusta a facultative parasite. The resulting brittle fracture can exhibit a ceramic-like fracture surface.  Black zone lines can often be seen in cross-sections of wood infected with K. deusta.

New fruiting bodies are formed in the spring and are flat and gray with white edges.  The inconspicuous fruiting bodies persist all year and their appearance changes to resemble asphalt or charcoal, consisting of black, domed, lumpy crusts that crumble when pushed with force. It is inedible.

References

External links 

 Index Fungorum
 USDA ARS Fungal Database

Fungal tree pathogens and diseases
Xylariales
Fungi described in 1778
Inedible fungi